Thailand participated at the 2018 Asian Para Games which was held in Jakarta, Indonesia from 6 to 13 October 2018.

Medals by sport

See also
 Thailand at the 2018 Asian Games

References

Nations at the 2018 Asian Para Games
Thailand at the Asian Para Games
2018 in Thai sport